Woman & Home is a monthly lifestyle magazine published by Future PLC. The London-based women’s lifestyle brand produces fashion and beauty features for real women in their 40s and upwards, along with inspirational articles on the home and garden, food pages with recipes and meal plans, travel content and thoroughly researched health features that are relevant to women in the 45+ demographic. The magazine also publishes monthly book reviews, author interviews and occasional short stories. 

While the magazine largely speaks to a British audience, it does have readers around the world. An edition of woman&home is published in South Africa and an export edition is sold worldwide. 

Woman & Home was acquired from TI Media Limited by the publishing group Future PLC in 2020 and now has writers and offices across the United States in cities including New York and Atlanta.

Early history
The magazine was launched in 1926 by Amalgamated Press.

Subsidiary publications
Woman & Home has a subsidiary publication, Feel Good You, a monthly health and wellbeing magazine.

Awards
The magazine was awarded the Consumer Magazine of the Year and the Consumer Media Brand of the Year by the PPA in July 2014.

Journalistic staff
 Editor - Miranda McMinn
 Fashion Director - Paula Moore
 Beauty Director - Sarah Cooper White
 Features Director - Jane Kemp
 Travel Editor - Helena Cartwright
 Books Editor - Zoe West
 Health Editor - Faye M Smith
 Home Editor - Esme Clemo
 Food Editor - Jennifer Bedloe
 Digital Editor - Rachael Martin

References

External links
 

1926 establishments in the United Kingdom
Lifestyle magazines published in the United Kingdom
Monthly magazines published in the United Kingdom
Women's magazines published in the United Kingdom
English-language magazines
Magazines established in 1926